Central Coast Mariners Football Club is an Australian professional association football club based in Gosford, on the Central Coast of New South Wales. The club was formed in November 2004, and the team played their first competitive match in May 2005, when they entered the 2005 Australian Club World Championship Qualifying Tournament. The Mariners play their home matches at Central Coast Stadium. 181 players have made a competitive first-team appearance for the club; those players are listed here. Players are listed in order of their first appearance for the Mariners, and alphabetical order by surname for players who debuted simultaneously.

The Mariners' record appearance-maker is John Hutchinson, who made 271 appearances over a 10-year playing career, ahead of Matt Simon. Hutchinson also holds the record for the most starts, having started in 232 games. Simon is the club's top goalscorer with 66 goals in his eleven seasons with the club, twenty-three more than next-highest scorer Adam Kwasnik. Fourteen players have made 100 appearances or more, including five members of the 2013 A-League Grand Final winning team. Danny Vukovic is the only goalkeeper to have made over 100 appearances for the side. Eight players have held the position of club captain, Alex Wilkinson for the longest period (five years).

Key
General
Appearances and goals are for first-team competitive matches only, including A-League Men, AFC Champions League, Australia Cup, A-League Pre-Season Challenge Cup and 2005 Australian Club World Championship Qualifying Tournament matches.
Statistics are correct up to 24 February 2023.

Table headers
Nationality – If a player played international football, the country/countries he played for are shown. Otherwise, the player's nationality is given as their country of birth.
Club career – The year of the player's first appearance for Central Coast Mariners to the year of his last appearance.
Starts – The number of games started.
Subs – The number of games played as a substitute.
Total – The total number of games played, both as a starter and as a substitute.
Goals – The number of goals scored.

Players

Club captains
Since 2005, eight players have held the position of club captain of the Central Coast Mariners. The first club captain was Noel Spencer, who was captain from 2005 to 2007. The longest-serving captain is Alex Wilkinson, who was captain from 2007 to 2012 after taking over from Spencer. Danny Vukovic is the current captain of the club after Oliver Bozanic left the club in 2022.

See also
List of Central Coast Mariners FC W-League players – players who appeared for the Mariners' now-defunct women's team

References

External links
 Central Coast Mariners official website

 
C
Association football player non-biographical articles